Eucosmophora schinusivora is a moth of the family Gracillariidae. It is found in Paraná, Brazil.

The larvae feed on Schinus terebinthifolus. They mine the leaves of their host plant.

References

Moths described in 2011
Acrocercopinae